OS X is a former name of Apple's operating system macOS.

OSX or OS X may also refer to:

 DC/OSx, 1980s-era Unix operating system by Pyramid Technology
 Old Saxon (ISO 639-3 language code), an early form of Low German
 OSX, a Brazilian shipbuilding company, part of the EBX Group 
OS-X series, a series of sounding rockets built by OneSpace

See also

OS 10 (disambiguation)
System 10 (disambiguation)
System X (disambiguation)

ja:OS X